Eduardo Gabriel Aquino Cossa (born 24 February 1997), commonly known as Pepê, is a Brazilian professional footballer who plays for Primeira Liga club Porto as a winger.

Formed at Foz do Iguaçu, he spent five years at Grêmio, where he made 144 appearances and scored 32 goals, while winning the Campeonato Gaúcho four consecutive times.

Club career

Foz do Iguaçu
Born on Foz do Iguaçu, Paraná state, Pepê graduated from the youth academy of hometown club Foz do Iguaçu Futebol Clube and spent part of the 2016 season with Coritiba. Ahead of the 2015 season, he was promoted to the senior team. During the 2016 Paranaense, he scored three goals including a brace against Paraná.

Grêmio
On 4 April 2016, Pepê joined Série A side Grêmio. On 28 May 2017, he made his Série A debut, coming on as a substitute for Everton in a 4–3 victory against Sport Recife. On 3 December, he scored his first goal for the club in a 4–3 defeat against Atlético Mineiro.

On 8 January 2018, Pepê extended his contract until 2020. On 7 August, he made his Copa Libertadores debut, starting in a 2–1 defeat against Argentinian club Estudiantes. His contract was further extended to 2022 on 26 September.

Pepê scored three goals in eight games as the team from Porto Alegre made the quarter-finals of the 2020 Copa Libertadores, including the only goal of an away win over Grenal rivals Internacional on 23 September in the group stage. In the reverse fixture on 12 March, he came on as a substitute and was one of eight players – split equally between the two teams – to be sent off in a brawl. In the year's national championship, he scored a personal best nine times, including one in a draw away to Inter on 3 October, and two in a 3–1 win over Botafogo 11 days later.

Porto
On 18 February 2021, Pepê signed with Primeira Liga side FC Porto, on a contract effective from 1 July and lasting until 2026. The €15 million fee was paid 70% to Grêmio and the remainder to Foz do Iguaçu, to be issued in four instalments over the following two years; Grêmio would receive 12.5% of a future sale. He made his debut on 8 August, replacing Mehdi Taremi for the last eight minutes of a 2–0 home win over Belenenses SAD. He scored his first goal on 19 September to conclude a 5–0 win over Moreirense also at the Estádio do Dragão.

Career statistics

Club

Honours
Grêmio
Campeonato Gaúcho: 2018, 2019, 2020, 2021

Porto
Primeira Liga: 2021–22
Taça de Portugal: 2021–22
Supertaça Cândido de Oliveira: 2022
Taça da Liga: 2022–23

References

External links
Profile at the FC Porto website

1997 births
Living people
People from Foz do Iguaçu
Association football forwards
Brazilian footballers
Campeonato Brasileiro Série A players
Campeonato Brasileiro Série D players
Foz do Iguaçu Futebol Clube players
Grêmio Foot-Ball Porto Alegrense players
Primeira Liga players
FC Porto players
Brazilian expatriate footballers
Brazilian expatriate sportspeople in Portugal
Expatriate footballers in Portugal
Sportspeople from Paraná (state)
Brazilian people of Paraguayan descent